Cape Spencer is a headland on the Alaska shore, at the side of the entrance to Cross Sound west of Juneau, Alaska. Located in Glacier Bay National Park and Preserve, it is the site of the Cape Spencer Light.

Spencer
Landforms of Hoonah–Angoon Census Area, Alaska